Parmaturus is a genus of catsharks in the family Scyliorhinidae. Four species were described in 2007 and another in 2019 with more species likely to be described in the near future.

Species
The following are the currently described species:
 Parmaturus albimarginatus Séret & Last, 2007 (white-tip catshark)
 Parmaturus albipenis Séret & Last, 2007 (white-clasper catshark)
 Parmaturus angelae  (Brazilian filetail catshark)
 Parmaturus bigus Séret & Last, 2007 (beige catshark)
 Parmaturus campechiensis S. Springer, 1979 (Campeche catshark)
 Parmaturus lanatus Séret & Last, 2007 (velvet catshark)
 Parmaturus macmillani Hardy, 1985 (McMillan's catshark)
 Parmaturus melanobranchus (W. L. Y. Chan, 1966) (blackgill catshark)
 Parmaturus pilosus Garman, 1906 (salamander shark)
 Parmaturus xaniurus (C. H. Gilbert, 1892) (filetail catshark)

There are several as yet undescribed species:
 Parmaturus sp. not yet described (roughback catshark)
 Parmaturus sp. not yet described (Indonesian filetail catshark)
 Parmaturus sp. not yet described (Gulf of Mexico filetail)

References

 
Shark genera
Taxa named by Samuel Garman